Motla Dasht (also Romanized as Motlā Dasht) is a village in Chubar Rural District, Haviq District, Talesh County, Gilan Province, Iran. At the 2006 census, its population was 97, in 24 families.

References 

Populated places in Talesh County